Peierls stress (also known as the lattice friction stress) is the force (first described by Rudolf Peierls and modified by Frank Nabarro) needed to move a dislocation within a plane of atoms in the unit cell. The magnitude varies periodically as the dislocation moves within the plane.  Peierls stress depends on the size and width of a dislocation and the distance between planes.  Because of this, Peierls stress decreases with increasing distance between atomic planes.  Yet since the distance between planes increases with planar atomic density,  slip of the dislocation is preferred on closely packed planes.

Peierls–Nabarro stress proportionality 

Where:
 the dislocation width
 = shear modulus
 = Poisson's ratio
 = slip distance or Burgers vector
 = interplanar spacing

The Peierls stress and yield strength temperature sensitivity 

The Peierls stress also relates to the temperature sensitivity of the yield strength of material because it very much depends on both short-range atomic order and atomic bond strength.  As temperature increases, the vibration of atoms increases, and thus both peierls stress and yield strength decrease as a result of weaker atomic bond strength at high temperatures.

References

Hertzberg, Richard W. Deformation and Fracture Mechanics of Engineering Materials 4th Edition

Crystallographic defects